Porolithon is a genus of red algae comprising 24 species. The Porolithon are the primary reef building algae. When coral reefs reach sea level, the corals break under the high energy impact of the waves, while the coralline red algae, primarily Porolithon, continuing building and cementing the reef structure.

Species 

Accepted species in the genus are:

 Porolithon aequinoctiale (Foslie) Foslie 
 Porolithon antillarum (Foslie & M.Howe) Foslie & M.Howe 
 Porolithon castellum E.Y.Dawson 
 Porolithon colliculosum Masaki 
 Porolithon imitatum R.A.Townsend & G.W.Saunders
 Porolithon improcerum (Foslie & M.Howe) M.Howe
 Porolithon maneveldtii R.A.Townsend & Huisman 
 Porolithon marshallense W.R.Taylor
 Porolithon oligocarpum (Foslie) W.H.Adey
 Porolithon onkodes (Heydrich) Foslie - tip
 Porolithon penroseae R.A.Townsend & P.W.Gabrielson
 Porolithon praetextatum (Foslie) Foslie 
 Porolithon sandvicense (Foslie) Foslie 
 Porolithon sonorense E.Y.Dawson

References

Corallinaceae
Red algae genera